Punakha District (Dzongkha: སྤུ་ན་ཁ་རྫོང་ཁག་; Wylie: Spu-na-kha rdzong-khag) is one of the 20 dzongkhags (districts) comprising Bhutan. It is bordered by Thimphu, Gasa, and Wangdue Phodrang Districts. The dominant language in the district is Dzongkha, the national language.

Culture

Pungtang Dechen Phodrang Dzong at Punakha, the administrative and religious center of the district, is the winter home of Bhutan's Dratshang Lhentshog (Central Monk Body). Since the 1680s the dzong has also been the site of a continuous vigil over the earthly body of Shabdrung Ngawang Namgyal, the founder of the country, which lies in a special chamber in the dzong. Punakha Dzong was the capital of Bhutan during the time of Shabdrung Ngawang Namgyal. The Punakha Dzong is one of the most historic dzongs in the whole country. Built by Shabdrung Ngawang Namgyal in the 17th century, it is located between the confluence of two rivers: Pho Chhu (male) and Mo Chhu (female).

 Khamsum Yulley Namgyal Choeten

Administrative divisions
Punakha District is divided into eleven village blocks (or gewogs):

Barp Gewog
Chhubu Gewog
Dzomo Gewog
Goenshari Gewog
Guma Gewog
Kabjisa Gewog
Lingmukha Gewog
Shenga Bjime Gewog
Talog Gewog
Toepisa Gewog
Toewang Gewog

Geography
Over half of Punakha District (the gewogs of Chhubu, Goenshari, Kabisa and Toewang) lies within Jigme Dorji National Park, one of the protected areas of Bhutan. The dzongkhag also contains biological corridors along the Thimphu District border.

See also
Districts of Bhutan
Punakha Province

Gallery

References

 
Districts of Bhutan